Scinax madeirae is a frog in the family Hylidae.  It is endemic to Brazil and Bolivia.

References

Frogs of South America
madeirae